Bendixen  is a surname. Notable people with the surname include:

Aage Bendixen (1887–1973), Danish actor
Alfred Bendixen, American literatary scholar
 Fanny Bendixen ( – 1899), Canadian gold-rush hotelier
Finn Bendixen (born 1949), Norwegian long-jumper
Friedrich Bendixen (1864–1920), German banker
Harry Bendixen (1901–1954), Danish footballer and journalist
Niclas Bendixen (born 1972), Danish theatre director
Ole Bendixen (1869–1958), Danish explorer
Ole Christian Bendixen (born 1947), Norwegian sailor
Ulla Bendixen, Danish folktronic musician

Danish-language surnames